Jawaharlal Nehru Medical College may refer to:
 Jawaharlal Nehru Medical College, Ajmer, Rajasthan, India
 Jawaharlal Nehru Medical College, Aligarh, Uttar Pradesh, India
 Jawaharlal Nehru Medical College, Belgaum, Karnataka, India
 Jawaharlal Nehru Medical College, Bhagalpur, Bihar, India
 Jawaharlal Nehru Medical College, Wardha, Maharashtra, India